is a Japanese director of anime, a Japanese animator, anime character designer and an illustrator.

Biography 
Uratani was the second generation animator of Telecom Animation Film. After leaving Telecom, she has worked for the World Masterpiece Theater, Studio 4°C, Madhouse and MAPPA. She is married to a fellow director of anime Sunao Katabuchi.

Selected works

Films 
 Kiki's Delivery Service - key animation, 1989
 Memories (1995 film) - key animation (Magnetic Rose, Cannon Fodder), 1995
  - assistant animation director, 2001
  - animation director, 2006
  - animation director, layout design, 2009
  - assistant director, writer, 2016

Television productions 
 The Blinkins: The Bear And The Blizzard - animation director, 1986
 Tales of Little Women - key animation (episodes 3, 5, 7, 9, 12, 16, 20, 24, 28, 32, 36, 40, 44, 48), 1987
 Moomin (1990 TV series) - key animation (episodes 6, 55, 61, 67), 1991
 Tico of the Seven Seas - key animation (episodes 9, 13, 18, 24, 28, 32, 36), 1994
 Romeo's Blue Skies - key animation (episodes 1, 4, 9, 12, 16, 19, 22, 25, 28, 32, 33), 1995
 Famous Dog Lassie - key animation (episodes 3, 4, 5, 7, 9, 12, 17, 21, 25), 1996
 Black Lagoon The Second Barrage - key animation (episode 24), 2006

OVA 
 Black Lagoon Roberta's Blood Trail - animation director (episodes 25, 27, 28), storyboard (episode 29), 2010
  - director, character design, animation director, storyboard, 2004

Video games 
 Ace Combat 04: Shattered Skies (2001) - animation director for Side-story movie

Commercials 
 NHK  PV of animation version - producer, 2013

References

External links 
 
 

Anime character designers
Japanese animators
Japanese animated film directors
Anime directors
Living people
Year of birth missing (living people)